Vincenzo Romano (born 12 March 1956 in Capaccio) is an Italian former professional footballer who played as a central defender. He played for 9 seasons (179 games, 4 goals) in Serie A for Avellino, Roma and Genoa.

References

1956 births
Living people
Italian footballers
Association football defenders
Rimini F.C. 1912 players
A.S. Roma players
U.S. Avellino 1912 players
Genoa C.F.C. players
Bologna F.C. 1909 players
Empoli F.C. players
Serie B players
Serie A players